Foltz Nunatak is a nunatak rising to about ,  north of Schwartz Peak in Antarctica. The feature is part of a nunatak group discovered and photographed from the air by Lincoln Ellsworth in November 1935. It was mapped by the United States Geological Survey (USGS) from surveys and U.S. Navy aerial photographs, 1961–68, and from Landsat imagery taken 1973–74. It was named by the Advisory Committee on Antarctic Names in 1987 after Gary F. Foltz, a USGS cartographic technician and a member of USGS satellite surveying teams at the South Pole Station during two winter periods, 1978 and 1984.

References 

Nunataks of Palmer Land